Hugh Sung (born September 25, 1968) is a Korean-American classical pianist.

Early life
Born  in Philadelphia, Pennsylvania, Sung began studying the piano with his mother at the age of three. At the age of eight, he began private studies with Eleanor Sokoloff. Sung made his debut with the Philadelphia Orchestra three years later, performing the Mozart Piano Concerto in B-flat major, K. 456 with his own cadenza. In 1982, at the age of thirteen, Sung was admitted to the Curtis Institute of Music, where he continued his musical studies with Eleanor Sokoloff, Jorge Bolet and Seymour Lipkin.

Career

By the time Sung graduated from the Curtis Institute of Music with a bachelor's degree, he had performed again with the Philadelphia Orchestra, toured extensively with the South Jersey Symphony Orchestra, and debuted with the Concerto Soloists Orchestra (currently known as the Chamber Orchestra of Philadelphia). During his final year of study, Sung started touring collaboratively with legendary violinist Aaron Rosand. That partnership eventually led to his appointment as staff pianist at the Curtis Institute in 1993. Three years later, he was named Director of Instrumental Accompaniment, and then in 1998, Director of Student Recitals.

Sung has toured extensively in cities throughout the United States, Canada, South America, England, Japan, Brazil, and South Korea. He has collaborated with renowned musicians such as Julius Baker, Jeffrey Khaner, Hilary Hahn and Leila Josefowicz, as well as contemporary composers such as Jennifer Higdon, Robert Maggio, and Harold Boatrite. Sung has recorded for Naxos Records, Albany Records, Vox, Biddulph, I Virtuosi, CRI, and Avie labels.

Sung has been an advocate for utilizing cutting-edge technologies to enhance the artistry of the classical musician. He developed a customized database to create a paperless office for his administrative work at Curtis. In 2002, shortly after the first Tablet PC's were introduced by Microsoft to the public, Sung adapted an early model for use as a digital music score reader with a foot pedal-activated page turning system. Currently, he is experimenting with live visualization techniques using programs such as Liquid Media and particle generators such as particleIllusion in a framework called the Visual Recital.

Discography

References

External links 
 Sung's biography at Naxos music label
 Hugh Sung's official website
 Sung's journal of projects for the Visual Recital concept
 Sung's video podcast series highlighting tech for musicians and interviews with prominent artists in the Classical Music field
 Hilary Hahn's Online Journal at Sony Music
 https://web.archive.org/web/20110312184611/http://www.pianoforum.it/cgi-bin/forum/YaBB.cgi?board=INTERNAZIONALI
 http://www.pianoforum.it/cgi-bin/forum/YaBB.cgi?num=1302232938

American classical pianists
Male classical pianists
American male pianists
Musicians from Philadelphia
Living people
American classical musicians of Korean descent
1968 births
Curtis Institute of Music alumni
20th-century American pianists
Classical musicians from Pennsylvania
21st-century classical pianists
20th-century American male musicians
21st-century American male musicians
21st-century American pianists